A penumbral lunar eclipse took place on Monday, February 19, 1962.

Visibility

Related lunar eclipses

Lunar year series

See also
List of lunar eclipses
List of 20th-century lunar eclipses

Notes

External links

1962-02
1962 in science